Early Tracks is a compilation album by Steve Earle. The album was released in 1987 capitalizing on the success of Guitar Town. The various rockabilly songs were recorded between 1982 and 1985; and includes songs from 1982's Pink and Black EP.

Track listing
All songs written by Steve Earle unless otherwise noted.
"Nothin' but You" - 2:30 (Epic 34-04070a)
"If You Need a Fool" - 2:11
"Continental Trailways Blues" - 2:19 (Epic 34-04070b)
"Open Up Your Door" - 2:07
"Breakdown Land" (Dennis R. Colby) - 2:59
"Squeeze Me In" - 2:32 (Epic 34-04307a)
"Annie, Is Tonight the Night" - 2:32
"My Baby Worships Me" - 2:08 (Epic 34-04307b)
"Cadillac" (Cadillac Holmes) - 2:41
"Devil's Right Hand" - 2:58
"What'll You Do About Me" (Dennis Linde) - 2:37 (Epic 34-04666a)
"Cry Myself to Sleep" (Paul Kennerley) - 2:56 (Epic 34-04666b)
"A Little Bit in Love" - 2:19 (Epic 34-04784a)
"The Crush" (John Hiatt) - 3:18 (Epic 34-04784b)

 tracks 1, 3, 6, 8 are from Earle's Pink & Black 7-inch EP released by LSI Records in 1982; these were released on 7-inch singles by Epic Records in 1983.
 tracks 11, 12, 13, 14 are from 7-inch singles released by Epic Records in 1985; these were added to the Koch Records CD reissue.

Personnel
Steve Earle - guitar, vocals
Pat Carter - guitar
Ron Kling - bass
Martin Parker - drums
Dale Sellers - lead guitar on "Squeeze Me In"

References

Steve Earle compilation albums
1987 compilation albums
Epic Records compilation albums